The United States Air Force's 2nd Air Support Operations Squadron (2 ASOS) is a combat support unit located in Vilseck, Germany. The squadron provides tactical command and control of airpower assets to the Joint Forces Air Component Commander and Joint Forces Land Component Commander for combat operations.

Mission
The 2nd Air Support Operations Squadron trains, equips, and maintains mission-ready air liaison, terminal attack control, and weather observation and forecasting elements to support the commanders of US Army units, such as the 2nd Cavalry Regiment.

Lineage
 Constituted as the 2nd Communications Squadron, Air Support on 8 April 1942
 Activated on 20 April 1942
 Redesignated 2nd Air Support Communication Squadron on 11 January 1943
 Redesignated 2nd Tactical Air Communications Squadron on 1 April 1944
 Inactivated on 7 December 1945
 Disbanded on 8 October 1948
  Reconstituted and redesignated 2nd Air Support Operations Squadron on 1 September 1996
 Activated on 30 September 1996

Assignments
 47th Bombardment Group, 20 April 1942
 II Ground Air Support Command, 1 May 1942
 III Ground Air Support Command (later III Air Support Command), 31 May 1942
 Twelfth Air Force, 26 December 1942; XII Air Support Command (later XII Tactical Air Command), 2 February 1943
 64th Fighter Wing, 6 July–c. November 1945
 4th Air Support Operations Group, 30 September 1996 – present

Stations

 Will Rogers Field, Oklahoma, 20 April 1942
 Camp Young, California, 18 May 1942
 Mansfield, Louisiana, 21 July 1942
 Will Rogers Field, Oklahoma, 23 September 1942
 Camp Kilmer, New Jersey, 22 November 1942–11 December 1942
 Mers El Kebir, Algeria, 26 December 1942
 Sainte-Barbe du Tlelat Airfield, Algeria, 26 December 1942
 Oran, Algeria, 2 January 1943
 Oujda, French Morocco, 15 January 1943
 Algiers, Algeria, 12 June 1943
 Korba, Tunisia, 1 July 1943
 Tunis, Tunisia, 18 July 1943
 Gela Airfield, Sicily, Italy, July 1943
 Palermo, Sicily, Italy 31 July 194
 Milazzo Airfield, Sicily, Italy, 31 August 1943
 St Antoine, Italy, 11 September 1943
 Paestum Airfield, Italy, 14 September 1943
 Pontecagnano Airport, Italy, 30 September 1943
 Naples, Italy, 7 October 1943
 Caserta, Italy, 24 October 1943
 Presenzano, Italy, 28 January 1944
 Sparanise, Italy, 27 March 1944
 Sermoneta, Italy, 3 June 1944
 Rome, Italy, 9 June 1944
 Tuscania, Italy, 17 June 1944
 Roccastrada, Italy, 2 July 1944
 Naples, Italy, 16 July 1944
 Saint-Tropez, France, 14 August 1944
 Brignoles, France, 20 August 1944
 Grenoble, France, 30 August 1944
 Lons-le-Saunier, France, 7 September 1944
 Vesoul, France, 19 September 1944
 Epinal, France, 4 October 1944
 Sarrebourg, France, 29 November 1944
 Saverne, France, 8 December 1944
 Luneville, France, 1 January 1945
 Sarreguemines, France, 20 March 1945
 Kaiserslautern, Germany, 25 March 1945
 Darmstadt, Germany, 1 April 1945
 Kitzingen, Germany, 15 April 1945
 Schwäbisch Gmünd, Germany, 26 April 1945
 Augsburg, Germany, 2 May 1945
 Darmstadt, Germany, 30 May 1945
 Stuttgart, Germany, 4 October 1945
 Darmstadt, Germany, 10 October 1945
 Mannheim, Germany, 18 October 1945
 Marseilles, France, November–26 November 1945
 Camp Patrick Henry, Virginia, 7 December 1945
 Würzburg, Germany, 30 September 1996
 Vilseck, Germany, 12 Jan 2007 – present

Decorations
Air Force Outstanding Unit Award

References

Notes

Bibliography

Air support operations squadrons of the United States Air Force
Military units and formations established in 1996